The Hardy Cemetery is the main cemetery of Hardy, Arkansas. It is located on the south side of Main Street, east of Hardy's downtown business district. When the city of Hardy was laid out in 1883, a  parcel of land for the cemetery was donated by one of its founders, Walker Clayton. This was expanded by about 1/2 acre in 1979, with the donation of land by members of the Biggers family. The original portion of the cemetery, where a number of Hardy's founders and later leading citizens are buried, was listed on the National Register of Historic Places in 2006.

See also
 National Register of Historic Places listings in Sharp County, Arkansas

References

External links

 

Cemeteries on the National Register of Historic Places in Arkansas
Buildings and structures completed in 1888
Buildings and structures in Sharp County, Arkansas
National Register of Historic Places in Sharp County, Arkansas
Cemeteries established in the 1880s